Civiløkonom, literally "civil economist", is a professional title in Denmark (with corresponding titles in Norway and Sweden, see below under "See also") used for an individual who holds a certain degree in business administration and economics after three years of studies: Erhvervsvidenskabelig Afgangseksamen (in Danish) candidatus mercaturae (in Latin). The candidatus mercaturae (cand.merc. for short) is a 2-year MSc programme on top of the BSc Handelsvidenskabelig Afgangseksamen (HA for short), so a person holding a cand.merc title has studied at a university for at least 5 years (3 years as an undergraduate/college student, and 2 years in graduate school). Both the undergraduate and the graduate programs are offered as combination programs including other scientific fields, such as computer science, psychology, math, philosophy etc.

See also
 Civilekonom for the corresponding Swedish title
 Siviløkonom for the corresponding Norwegian title

Academic degrees of Denmark
Business qualifications
Titles
Business occupations
Professional titles and certifications
Scandinavian titles
Economics occupations
Economics education